Jorăști is a commune in Galați County, Western Moldavia, Romania with a population of 1,929 people. It is composed of three villages: Lunca, Jorăști and Zărnești.

Natives
Ioan Gheorghe Savin

References

Communes in Galați County
Localities in Western Moldavia